Fighter Squadron 83 or VF-83 was an aviation unit of the United States Navy. Originally established on 1 May 1944, it was disestablished on 24 September 1945. It was the first US Navy squadron to be designated as VF-83.

Operational history

CVG-83 was in action in the Pacific theatre from 10 March to 15 September 1945 participating in raids on Kyushu, supporting the invasion of Okinawa, the discovery and sinking of the Japanese battleship Yamato and other air strikes against the Japanese home islands.

See also
History of the United States Navy
List of inactive United States Navy aircraft squadrons
List of United States Navy aircraft squadrons

References

Strike fighter squadrons of the United States Navy